Mike Dupree may refer to:

 Mike Dupree (baseball) (born 1953), Major League Baseball pitcher
 Mike Dupree (music producer), music producer, songwriter and DJ